İsa Kaykun (born 5 June 1988) is a Turkish professional footballer who currently plays as a centre-back.

Kaykun began his career in Germany, playing for clubs such as SV Waldhof Mannheim and FC Heidelsheim. Kaykun moved to Kasımpaşa on 1 February 2010, signing a contract until May 2014.

References

External links
İsa Kaykun at FuPa

1988 births
Living people
Footballers from Istanbul
Turkish footballers
SV Waldhof Mannheim players
Kasımpaşa S.K. footballers
Eyüpspor footballers
İstanbul Güngörenspor footballers
1. FC Bruchsal players
Süper Lig players
Association football forwards